The Cook County, Illinois, general election was held on November 6, 2018.

Primaries were held March 20, 2018.

Elections were held for Assessor, Clerk, Sheriff, Treasurer, President of the Cook County Board of Commissioners, all 17 seats of the Cook County Board of Commissioners, Cook County Board of Review districts 2 and 3, five seats on the Water Reclamation District Board, and  judgeships on the Circuit Court of Cook County.

Election information
2018 was a midterm election year in the United States. The primaries and general elections for Cook County races coincided with those for federal congressional races and those for state elections.

Voter turnout
Voter turnout in Cook County during the primaries was 30.84%, with 938,639 ballots cast. Among these, 795,427 Democratic, 137,286 Republican, 206 Green, and 5,720 nonpartisan primary ballots were cast. Turnout in the city of Chicago was 32.69%, and turnout in suburban Cook County was 29.05%.

The general election saw 58.09% turnout, with 1,795,518 ballots cast. Turnout in Chicago was 60.67%, and turnout in suburban Cook County was 55.65%. Turnout in Cook County exceeded the national average, which was 50.3%. Turnout was considered high in the United States during the 2018 midterm elections, with it being the highest national midterm turnout since 1914.

Assessor 

In the 2018 Cook County Assessor election, incumbent second-term assessor Joseph Berrios, a Democrat, lost his bid for reelection, being unseated in the Democratic primary by Fritz Kaegi, who went on to win the general election.

Primaries

Democratic

Republican
No candidates, ballot-certified or formal write-in, ran in the Republican primary. However, the party ultimately nominated Joseph Paglia.

General election

Clerk 

In the 2018 Cook County Clerk election, incumbent seventh-term clerk David Orr, a Democrat, did not seek reelection. Democrat Karen Yarbrough won the election to replace him.

By winning the election, Yarbrough became the first woman to ever hold the office of Cook County Clerk.

Primaries

Democratic
Jan Kowalski McDonald was disqualified, and votes cast for her were not counted. However, due to ballot printing deadlines, her name was included on the ballot.

Republican
No candidates, ballot-certified or formal write-in, ran in the Republican primary.

General election

Sheriff 

In the 2018 Cook County Sheriff election, incumbent third-term Sheriff Tom Dart, a Democrat, was reelected.

Primaries

Democratic

Republican
No candidates, ballot-certified or formal write-in, ran in the Republican primary.

General election

Treasurer 

In the 2018 Cook County Treasurer election, incumbent fifth-term treasurer Maria Pappas, a Democrat, was reelected.

Primaries

Democratic

Republican
No candidates, ballot-certified or formal write-in, ran in the Republican primary.

General election

President of the Cook County Board of Commissioners 

In the 2018 President of the Cook County Board of Commissioners election, incumbent second-term president Toni Preckwinkle, a Democrat, was reelected.

Primaries

Democratic

Republican
Only write-in candidates ran in the Republican primary. No certified write-in received enough votes to win the nomination.

General election

Cook County Board of Commissioners 

The 2018 Cook County Board of Commissioners election saw all seventeen seats of the Cook County Board of Commissioners up for election to four-year terms.

Seven new members were elected, and ten incumbents were reelected. Three incumbents did not seek reelection. Four incumbents lost reelection, with two being defeated in primaries and the other two losing their general elections.

Nine races saw a Democrat unchallenged in the general election.

Two elections saw seats change party, in both instances seeing an incumbent Republican losing to a Democratic challenger, creating a net gain of two seats for Democrats and a net loss of two seats for Republicans.

1st district

Incumbent first-term Commissioner Richard Boykin, a Democrat, lost reelection, being unseated in the Democratic primary by Brandon Johnson by a margin of 0.88%. Johnson went on to win the general election unopposed.

Primaries

Democratic

Republican
Only write-in candidates ran in the Republican primary. No certified write-in received enough votes to win the nomination.

General election

2nd district

Incumbent Commissioner Dennis Deer, who was appointed in 2017 to fill the vacancy left by the death in office of Robert Steele, won election to his first full term.

Primaries

Democratic

Republican
No candidates, ballot-certified or formal write-in, ran in the Republican primary.

General election

3rd district

Incumbent Commissioner Jerry Butler, a Democrat who first assumed the office in 1985, did not seek reelection. Democrat Bill Lowry was elected to succeed him.

Primaries

Democratic

Republican
No candidates, ballot-certified or formal write-in, ran in the Republican primary. Republicans ultimately nominated George Blakemore.

General election

4th district

Incumbent Commissioner Stanley Moore, a Democrat who was appointed to the office in 2013 and was elected outright to a full term in 2014, won reelection to a second full term.

Primaries

Democratic

Republican
No candidates, ballot-certified or formal write-in, ran in the Republican primary.

General election

5th district

Incumbent sixth-term Commissioner Deborah Sims, a Democrat, was reelected.

Primaries

Democratic

Republican
No candidates, ballot-certified or formal write-in, ran in the Republican primary.

General election

6th district

Incumbent Commissioner Edward Moody, a Democrat who was appointed to the seat in 2016 following the death in office of Joan Patricia Murphy, did not seek reelection. Democrat Donna Miller was elected to succeed him.

Primaries

Democratic
Donna Miller defeated Patricia Joan Murphy, the daughter of deceased former 6th district commissioner Joan Patricia Murphy and Crestwood mayor Louis Presta.

Republican
No candidates, ballot-certified or formal write-in, ran in the Republican primary.

General election

7th district

Incumbent second-term Commissioner Jesús "Chuy" García, a Democrat, did not seek reelection, instead opting to run for election to Illinois's 4th congressional district. Democrat Alma Anaya was elected to succeed him.

Primaries

Democratic

Republican
No candidates, ballot-certified or formal write-in, ran in the Republican primary.

General election

8th district

Incumbent first-term Commissioner Luis Arroyo Jr., a Democrat, was reelected.

Primaries

Democratic

Republican

General election

9th district

Incumbent sixth-term Commissioner Peter N. Silvestri, a Republican, was reelected.

Primaries

Democratic

Republican

General election

10th district

Incumbent Commissioner Bridget Gainer, a Democrat first appointed in 2009 and elected outright to two full-terms, was reelected.

Primaries

Democratic

Republican
No candidates, ballot-certified or formal write-in, ran in the Republican primary.

General election

11th district

Incumbent Commissioner John P. Daley, a Democrat in office since 1992, was reelected.

Primaries

Democratic

Republican

General election

12th district

Incumbent second-term Commissioner John Fritchey, a Democrat, lost reelection, being unseated in the Democratic primary by Bridget Degnen, who went on to win the general election unopposed.

Primaries

Democratic

Republican
No candidates, ballot-certified or formal write-in, ran in the Republican primary.

General election

13th district

Incumbent fourth-term Commissioner Larry Suffredin, a Democrat, was reelected.

Primaries

Democratic

Republican

General election

14th district

Incumbent fifth-term Commissioner Gregg Goslin, a Republican, lost reelection to Democrat Scott R. Britton.

Primaries

Democratic

Republican

General election

15th district

Incumbent third-term Commissioner Tim Schneider, a Republican, lost reelection to Democrat Kevin B. Morrison.

Primaries

Democratic

Republican

General election

16th district

Incumbent second-term Commissioner Jeff Tobolski, a Democrat, was reelected, running unopposed in both the Democratic primary and general election.

Primaries

Democratic

Republican
No candidates, ballot-certified or formal write-in, ran in the Republican primary.

General election

17th district

Incumbent Commissioner Sean M. Morrison, a Republican appointed in 2015 following the resignation of Elizabeth Ann Doody Gorman, was reelected, defeating his Democratic opponent, Abdelnasser Rashid, by a narrow 1.14% margin in the general election.

Primaries

Democratic

Republican

General election

Cook County Board of Review

In the 2018 Cook County Board of Review election, two seats, each Democratic-held, out of its three seats were up for election. Both incumbents won reelection, running unopposed in both their primary and general election races.

The Cook County Board of Review has its three seats rotate the length of terms. In a staggered fashion (in which no two seats have coinciding two-year terms), the seats rotate between two consecutive four-year terms and a two-year term.

2nd district

Incumbent second-term member Michael Cabonargi, a Democrat last reelected in 2016, was reelected, running unopposed in both the Democratic primary and general election. This election was to a four-year term.

Primaries

Democratic

Republican
No candidates, ballot-certified or formal write-in, ran in the Republican primary.

General election

3rd district

Incumbent fourth-term member Larry Rogers, Jr., a Democrat last reelected in 2014, was reelected, running unopposed in both the Democratic primary and general election. This election was to a four-year term.

Primaries

Democratic

Republican
No candidates, ballot-certified or formal write-in, ran in the Republican primary.

General election

Water Reclamation District Board 

In the 2018 Metropolitan Water Reclamation District of Greater Chicago  election, five of the nine seats on the Metropolitan Water Reclamation District of Greater Chicago board were up for election. Three were regularly scheduled elections, and two were special elections due to a vacancies.

Regularly-scheduled election
Three six year term seats were up for a regularly-scheduled election. Since three six-year seats were up for election, voters could vote for up to three candidates, and the top-three finishers would win.

Three of the incumbents for the three seats were seeking reelection, Kari Steele, Debra Shore, and  Martin Durkan, all three Democrats. Steele and Shore won reelection to two of the seats, while Darkan lost renomination in the Democratic primary. Democrat Marcelino Garcia also won election was newly elected to the third seat.

Primaries

Democratic

Republican

Green

General election

Unexpired term, vacancy of Santos (2 years)
A special election was held to fill the seat vacated by Cynthia Santos following her 2016 appointment to the Illinois Pollution Control Board. The seat had been filled by interim appointee David Walsh up until the election.

Primaries

Democratic

Republican
No candidates, ballot-certified or formal write-in, ran in the Republican primary.

Green

General election

Unexpired term, vacancy of Bradford (2 years)
Three days before the candidate filing deadline, incumbent  Water Reclamation District Board member Timothy Bradford's died, leaving his seat vacant. A special election was scheduled to fill his seat. No candidates filed in time to be included on the primary ballots, but Cam Davis won the Democratic Party nomination and Geoffrey Cubbage won the Green Party nomination, each as write-in candidates. Cam Davis won the general election.

Primaries

Democratic

Republican
No candidates, ballot-certified or formal write-in, ran in the Republican primary.

Green

General election

Judicial elections 

10 judgeships on the Circuit Court of Cook County were up for partisan elections due to vacancies. In each of these races, Democratic nominees went unchallenged in the general election. Retention elections were also held for judgeships on the Circuit Court of Cook County. For the first time in three decades, a Circuit Court of Cook County judge (Matthew Coghlan) lost retention.

29 subcircuit courts judgeships were also up for partisan elections due to vacancies. Retention elections were also held for subcircuit courts judgeships.

Ballot questions 
Four ballot questions were included on ballots county-wide. One was included on primary ballots in March, while the other three were included on general election ballots in November.

March

Legalize Marijuana

A ballot question was referred by the Cook County Board of Commissioners to the voters of Cook County as to whether or not the County's voters advise the State of Illinois to legalize marijuana. All 17 members of the Board of Commissioners had unanimously approved holding this ballot question.

The question asked,

November

Earned Sick Time
A ballot question was created by a successful initiative petition which asked Cook County voters whether to empower each city in Cook County to establish a law that allows workers to earn up to 40 hours a year of sick time.

The ballot measure asked the question,

Gun Dealer Penalties
A ballot question was created by a successful initiative petition which asked Cook County voters whether they believed that Illinois should strengthen penalties for the illegal trafficking of firearms and require all gun dealers to be certified by the State.

The ballot measure asked the question,

Min Wage 13
A ballot question was created by a successful initiative petition which asked Cook County voters whether to empower each city in Cook County to establish a $13 per hour minimum wage.

The ballot measure asked the question,

Other elections
Coinciding with the primaries, elections were held to elect both the Democratic and Republican committeepeople for the suburban townships.

See also 
 2018 Illinois elections

References 

Cook County
Cook County
2018
Cook County 2018